Beverley Historic District is a national historic district located at Staunton, Virginia. The district encompasses 131 contributing buildings in downtown Staunton.  It is a compact commercial district characterized by a well-preserved collection of 19th-century buildings.  The buildings are characteristically two- to four-story, brick structures in a variety of popular architectural styles including Romanesque Revival and primarily Italianate.  Notable buildings include the old YMCA (1890), Hoover House Hotel (1893-1894), Putnam Organ Works Store (1894), City Hall (c. 1877, 1927), Odd Fellows Hall (c. 1895), U.S. Post Office (1936), and the Masonic Temple building (1895-1896).  Located in the district are the separately listed National Valley Bank and Augusta County Courthouse.

It was added to the National Register of Historic Places in 1982.

References

Romanesque Revival architecture in Virginia
Italianate architecture in Virginia
Buildings and structures in Staunton, Virginia
National Register of Historic Places in Staunton, Virginia
Historic districts on the National Register of Historic Places in Virginia